Cyrtandra kaulantha, the Waikane valley cyrtandra, is a species of flowering plant in the family Gesneriaceae, native to Oahu, Hawaii. It is of hybrid origin, with the parents possibly being C.grandiflora and C.hawaiensis.

References

kaulantha
Endemic flora of Hawaii
Plants described in 1950